Winifred Ellen "Winnie" Silverthorne (3 March 1925 – 7 March 1998) was a British pair skater who competed with her brother Dennis Silverthorne.  The pair won the silver medal at the 1947 European Figure Skating Championships and finished fourth at that year's World Figure Skating Championships.  They then finished fifth at the 1948 Winter Olympics and sixth at that year's World Championships. She was born in Brighton, England.

Results
(with Silverthorne)

References
Sports-Reference.com profile

British female pair skaters
Olympic figure skaters of Great Britain
Figure skaters at the 1948 Winter Olympics
1925 births
1998 deaths
European Figure Skating Championships medalists